Eoudong is a 1985 South Korean film starring Ahn Sung-ki and Lee Bo-hee. Lee Bo-hee won the best actress award at Grand Bell Awards in 1986. The film was selected as the South Korean entry for the Best Foreign Language Film at the 58th Academy Awards, but was not accepted as a nominee.

Synopsis
The film is set in Korea's Joseon Dynasty, during the reign of King Seonngjong, when strict Confucianism forced women to follow the male dominant society.

Reception
Eoudong was a successful film both at the box office and with the critics. It eventually sold over 500,000 tickets, and critics praised the film for its cinematography and depiction of the historical time period.

Cast
 Lee Bo-hee - Uhwudong
 Ahn Sung-ki - Galmae
 Kim Myung-gon - Chungha
 Park Won-sook - Hyangji
 Shin Chaong-shik - Yun Phil-sang
 Kim Ki-ju - PArk Yun-chang
 Moon Tai-sun - Jeong Chang-son
 Kim Seong-chan
 Kim Ha-rim
 Yun Sun-hong - Seongjong of Joseon

See also
 List of submissions to the 58th Academy Awards for Best Foreign Language Film
 List of South Korean submissions for the Academy Award for Best Foreign Language Film

References

External links
 
 

1985 films
Films set in the 15th century
Films set in the Joseon dynasty
South Korean erotic films
Films directed by Lee Jang-ho
Biographical films about entertainers